The women's 200 metre backstroke competition of the swimming events at the 1967 Pan American Games took place on 26 July at the Pan Am Pool. It was the first appearance of this event in the Pan American Games.

This race consisted of four lengths of the pool, all in backstroke.

Results
All times are in minutes and seconds.

Heats

Final 
The final was held on July 26.

References

Swimming at the 1967 Pan American Games
Pan